Jouret el-Termos (also spelled Jurat et-Tourmous) is a village and municipality located in the Keserwan District of the  Keserwan-Jbeil Governorate in Lebanon. It has an average elevation of 1,010 meters above sea level (ranging from 750 to 1,100 m) and a total land area of 122 hectares. 
Jouret el-Termos's inhabitants are Maronites.

References

Populated places in Keserwan District
Maronite Christian communities in Lebanon